Krivaja may refer to the following locations:

Bosnia and Herzegovina

Villages
Krivaja (Cazin), a village in the municipality of Cazin, Federation of Bosnia and Herzegovina
, a village in the municipality of Zavidovići, Federation of Bosnia and Herzegovina
, a village in the municipality of Prijedor, Republika Srpska

Rivers
Krivaja (Bosna), a river in Federation of Bosnia and Herzegovina, tributary of Bosna
Krivaja (Velika Usora), a river in Republika Srpska, tributary of Velika Usora

Serbia

Villages
Krivaja (Bačka Topola), a village in the municipality of Bačka Topola, Vojvodina
Krivaja (Šabac), a village in the municipality of Šabac
Krivaja (Blace), a village in the municipality of Blace
Krivaja (Sjenica), a village in the municipality of Sjenica

Rivers
Krivaja (Great Bačka Canal), a river in Vojvodina, tributary of Great Bačka Canal
Krivaja (Đetinja), a river in Central Serbia, tributary of Đetinja

Other
Krivaja (lake), a lake near Bačka Topola, Vojvodina
, fortress not far from Šabac, Central Serbia

See also
, a village in the municipality of Vojnić, Croatia
Operation Krivaja '95